The 2012 Girabola was the 34th season of top-tier football in Angola. It ran from 3 March to 4 November 2012 and involved 16 teams, the bottom three of which were relegated to 2013 Segundona.

Changes from 2011 season
Relegated: FC de Cabinda, Primeiro de Maio, Académica do Lobito 
Promoted: Atlético do Namibe, Sporting de Cabinda, 
Nacional de Benguela

League table

Results

Season statistics

Top scorers

Hat-tricks

References

External links
 Official Girabola site
Girabola 2012 stats at jornaldosdesportos.sapo.ao
 RSSSF info

Girabola seasons
1
Angola
Angola